Fabien Safanjon (born 31 October 1972) is a former professional footballer who played as a defender. He joined Gueugnon in 1989, remaining with the club for over a decade and making more than 230 appearances before moving to Chamois Niortais. After five years and having made over 100 appearances for them, Safanjon moved to Rouen where he spent the final year of his playing career, finishing in 2005.

External links
Fabien Safanjon profile at chamoisfc79.fr

1972 births
Living people
French footballers
Association football defenders
FC Gueugnon players
Chamois Niortais F.C. players
FC Rouen players
Ligue 1 players
Ligue 2 players